Still Life is a 2007 Filipino film written, directed, and produced by Katski Flores and starring Glaiza de Castro with John Lloyd Cruz in a minor cameo role.

Plot
James Masino is a gifted painter diagnosed with a disease called Gillian Barre Syndrome or GBS. His doctor tells him he will eventually become completely paralyzed. Facing a future where he can no longer paint, James packs up his life in the city and goes into a self imposed exile at a friend's isolated house in a deserted island. His goal is to paint his final masterpiece, and then die.

His plans are thwarted when a girl shows up at the house, named Emma, who claims she too has been given access by the owner to spend a few days there. With no way to make contact with the outside world, James decides to let Emma stay at the house with him. At first he is annoyed by the disruption of his peace in the house. Slowly he is drawn to Emma against his will. One night Emma discovers in his secret room a wall filled with sketches of her. They become friends that evening and confide in each other their stories.

Emma learns of James' plan and tells him he is being a coward. They talk about the philosophy of suicide, why it can't be a legitimate choice. Emma reminds James life is precious. She tells him her story, that she got pregnant by a lover who abandoned her, and she was forced to give the baby up for adoption, to give it a better life.

Somehow the friendship inspires James and finally after spending an afternoon at a nearby town, James finds the inspiration for his final piece. Emma is his mode. But just as he begins to paint, his disease strikes and he collapses in a painful seizure.

He wakes up in a hospital. with his mother crying. She tells him they found him at the house, with his hands bleeding. James remembers he attempted to kill himself on the first night he arrived at the house. But he thought he chickened out. Turns put he didn't and the entire experience including meeting Emma was just a dream. His mother begs him to not to do anything like that again. She reminds him that whatever happens they will make it, as a family. They will help him. There is life after art.

Some time later, James returns to the house and finally finishes the painting. 
We see his parents at the tomb of the woman who gave James to them to adopt. They are holding a small framed print of James' final masterpiece—a painting of her. The last scene shows James being interviewed by an actor, and he tells him he doesn't know what happened. Nor can he explain it. He is just happy that he met her in his dream.

Cast
 Ron Capinding as James
 Glaiza de Castro as Emma
 Dimples Romana
 Irma Adlawan		
 Morny de Guzman
 Joseph Dela Cruz
 Alcris Galura

Recognition

Awards and nomination
 2007, nominated for Balanghai Trophy for 'Best Film' at  Cinemalaya Independent Film Festival for Katski Flores
 2008, won a Philippines Golden Screen Award for 'Best Visual Effects' for August Lyle Espino
 2008, nominated for FAMAS Award for 'Best Cinematography'for Dan Villegas 
 2008, nominated for Gawad Urian Award for 'Best Actress' for Glaiza de Castro 
 2008, nominated for Gawad Urian Award for 'Best Cinematography' for Dan Villegas 
 2008, nominated for Philippines Golden Screen Award for 'Best Motion Picture (Drama)'
 2008, nominated for Philippines Golden Screen Award for 'Best Performance by an Actress in a Lead Role (Drama)' for Glaiza de Castro 
 2008, nominated for Philippines Golden Screen Award for 'Breakthrough Performance by an Actor' for Ron Capinding 
 2008, nominated for Philippines Golden Screen Award for 'Best Cinematography' for Dan Villegas 
 2008, nominated for Philippines Golden Screen Award for 'Best Editing' for Maui Mauricio 
 2008, nominated for Philippines Golden Screen Award for 'Best Production Design',for Cris Silva 
 2008, nominated for Philippines Golden Screen Award for 'Best Sound' for Joey Santos and Katski Flores 
 2008, nominated for Philippines Golden Screen Award for 'Best Original Song' for Cynthia Alexander for her song "Comfort In Your Strangeness"
 2008, nominated for Star Award for 'Digital Movie Cinematographer of the Year' for Dan Villegas 
 2008, nominated for YCC Award by Young Critics Circle for 'Best Achievement in Cinematography and Visual Design' for Dan Villegas and Cris Silva
 2008, nominated for YCC Award by Young Critics Circle, Philippines for 'Best Achievement in Sound and Aural Orchestration' for Joey Santos and Wincy Aquino Ong 
 2008, nominated for YCC Award by Young Critics Circle, Philippines for 'Best Performance by Male or Female, Adult or Child, Individual or Ensemble in Leading or Supporting Role' for Ron Capinding

References

External links
 Still Life at the Internet Movie Database

2007 films
Philippine drama films